No Exit is a one-act chamber opera by Andy Vores based on the 1944 existentialist play by Jean-Paul Sartre. The opera was commissioned by Boston's Guerilla Opera and had its world premiere, on April 24, 2008, at the Boston Conservatory's Zack Box Theatre.

Roles

Performance history
The opera was written for Boston's Guerilla Opera and had its world premiere, directed by Sally Stunkel, on April 24, 2008, at the Boston Conservatory's Zack Box Theatre. The opera had its second production by Chicago Opera Vanguard October 16–18, 2009 in the Hoover-Leppen Theater at the Center on Halsted. No Exit received its third production with Guerilla Opera, directed by Nathan Troup, on September 19, 2013. Most recently, No Exit was performed on February 27, 28 and March 1, 2014 as a part of Florida Grand Opera's Unexpected Operas in Unexpected Places initiative, designed to bring lesser-known operas to unique venues throughout South Florida.

References

External links
Andy Vores web site
Guerilla Opera web site
Chicago Opera Vanguard's No Exit mini-site

English-language operas
2008 operas
Operas by Andy Vores
Operas
Operas based on plays